KGOZ (101.7 FM, "Z 101.7") is an American radio station licensed to serve Gallatin, the county seat of Daviess County, Missouri.  The station, established in 1994, is owned by the Par Broadcast Group and the broadcast license is held by Par Broadcasting Company, Inc. The station's tower is located in northwestern Livingston County, Missouri, near the community of Lock Springs.  The studios are located in Trenton, Missouri.

The station was assigned the call sign "KGOZ" by the Federal Communications Commission (FCC) on February 26, 1993.

Programming
KGOZ broadcasts a country music format to north central Missouri. KGOZ airs North Central Missouri College sports, including women's and men's basketball Region 16 games and selected baseball and softball games, in addition to selected high school sporting events, including being the home of Trenton High School football.

References

External links
KGOZ official website

GOZ
Country radio stations in the United States
Radio stations established in 1994
Daviess County, Missouri
1994 establishments in Missouri